The navarch was the magistrate who commanded the fleet in Ancient Sparta.

History and role
The powers of the navarch were extensive and were not subordinate to the two Spartan kings. The navarch commanded the fleet, but could also lead his embarked troops on land, performed the sacrifices, distributed wages and booty, negotiated with foreign states, and even administered the territories he captured. An ambitious man such as Lysander could therefore yield formidable influence in Sparta through his time as navarch at the end of the Peloponnesian War (431–404). As a result, Aristotle rightly described the navarchy as another kingship. Indeed, the navarch's powers were probably taken away from the kings at some point during the 6th century, because they had no authority on the sea. For example, Herodotus writes that in 480 king Leotychidas was also navarch at the Battle of Salamis, so it means he had to be navarch to be able to command the fleet.

Herodotus' description of Leotychidas as navarch in 480 is furthermore the first mention of the navarchy in the sources, but it was likely created earlier, perhaps in 512 for the first attack of Sparta against Athens by Anchimolus, likely the first navarch.  In the beginning the office was probably irregular and no navarch was appointed for most of the Pentecontaetia (479–431), as the Spartans did not launch any navy during this period. In addition, the navarch was not a yearly magistrate; it depended on the mission given, because Cnemus—the first navarch of the Peloponnesian War—was elected in summer 430, but remained in power for more than 12 months, until the winter of 429/428.

Following the defeat of the Spartan navy at Cyzicus in 410, a law was passed an established fixed terms from spring to spring. In about 400 another law forbade iteration of the office, but repetition was apparently allowed, since Teleutias was probably navarch three times. This law could furthermore be bypassed by appointing a secretary—in effect vice-admiral—to the navarch; the influential Lysander therefore became secretary twice. The navarchs were elected for one year by the Spartan assembly, supervised by the ephors. One exception took place in 395, when the king Agesilaus II was granted the privilege to appoint the navarch.

It seems the navarchy disappeared after the catastrophic defeat of Leuctra in 371.

List of Spartan navarchs

References

Bibliography

Ancient sources 
 Aristotle, Politics.

Modern sources 
 Paul Cartledge, Sparta and Lakonia, A Regional History 1300–362 BC, London, Routledge, 2002 (originally published in 1979). 
 Caroline Falkner, "Astyochus, Sparta's Incompetent Navarch?", Phoenix, Vol. 53, No. 3/4 (Autumn - Winter, 1999), pp. 206–221. 
 Simon Hornblower, A Commentary on Thucydides, Volume I, Books I-III, Oxford, Clarendon Press, 1991. 
 Paul Poralla & Alfred S. Bradford, Prosopographie der Lakedaimonier, bis auf die Zeit Alexanders des Grossen, Chicago, 1985 (originally published in 1913). 
 Paul A. Rahe, Sparta's First Attic War, The Grand Strategy of Classical Sparta, 478–446 B.C., New Haven, Yale University Press, 2019. 
 Raphael Sealey, "Die spartanische Nauarchie", Klio, 58, 1976, pp. 335–358. 
 Lukas Thommen, "Xenophon und die spartanische Nauarchie", Historika, Storia Greca i Romana, V. 5: Great is the power of the sea, 2015, pp. 313–320.

Military history of Sparta
Admirals
Military ranks of Sparta